Bitab (also Romanized as Bītāb; also known as Potyāb) is a village in Sarbuk Rural District, Sarbuk District, Qasr-e Qand County, Sistan and Baluchestan Province, Iran. At the 2006 census, its population was 40, in 9 families.

References 

Populated places in Qasr-e Qand County